The Medicine Lodge Treaty is the overall name for three treaties signed near Medicine Lodge, Kansas, between the Federal government of the United States and southern Plains Indian tribes in October 1867, intended to bring peace to the area by relocating the Native Americans to reservations in Indian Territory and away from European-American settlement. The treaty was negotiated after investigation by the Indian Peace Commission, which in its final report in 1868 concluded that the wars had been preventable.  They determined that the United States government and its representatives, including the United States Congress, had contributed to the warfare on the Great Plains by failing to fulfill their legal obligations and to treat the Native Americans with honesty.

The U.S. government and tribal chiefs met at a place traditional for Native American ceremonies, at their request. The first treaty was signed October 21, 1867, with the Kiowa and Comanche tribes.  The second, with the Kiowa-Apache, was signed the same day.  The third treaty was signed with the Southern Cheyenne and Arapaho on October 28.

Under the Medicine Lodge Treaty, the tribes were assigned reservations of diminished size compared to territories defined in an 1865 treaty. The treaty tribes never ratified the treaty by vote of adult males, as it required. In addition, by changing allotment policy under the Dawes Act and authorizing sales under the Agreement with the Cheyenne and Arapaho (1890) and the  Agreement with the Comanche, Kiowa and Apache (1892) signed with the Cherokee Commission, the Congress effectively further reduced their reservation territory. The Kiowa chief Lone Wolf filed suit against the government for fraud on behalf of the tribes in Lone Wolf v. Hitchcock. In 1903 the U.S. Supreme Court ruled against the tribes, determining that the Congress had "plenary power" and the political right to make such decisions.   In the aftermath of that case, Congress acted unilaterally on land decisions related to other reservations as well.

Because of the outstanding issues with the treaty and subsequent government actions, in the mid-20th century, the Kiowa, Arapaho and Comanche filed several suits for claims against the U.S. government.  Over decades, they won substantial settlements of monetary compensation in the amount of tens of millions of dollars, although it took years for the cases to be resolved.

Indian Peace Commission 

On July 20, 1867, Congress established the Indian Peace Commission to negotiate peace with Plains Indian tribes who were warring with the United States. The Peace Commission met in St. Louis, Missouri, on August 6, 1867, where it elected Nathaniel G. Taylor, Commissioner of Indian Affairs, as its president. Commissioners agreed that lasting peace was contingent upon separating Indians regarded as "hostile" from those regarded as friendly, removing all Indian tribes onto reservations away from the routes of U.S. westward expansion, and making provision for their maintenance.

The official report of the Commission to the President of the United States, dated January 7, 1868, describes detailed histories of the causes of the Indian Wars including: numerous social and legal injustices to Indians, repeated violations of numerous treaties, acts of corruption by many of the local agents, and culpability of Congress in failing to fulfill certain legal obligations. The report asserts that the Indian Wars were completely preventable had the United States government and its representatives acted with legal and moral honesty in dealing with the Indians.

Other members of the peace commission were Lieutenant General William T. Sherman, commander of the Military Division of the Missouri; Major General William S. Harney (retired), who had taken part in earlier conflicts with the Cheyenne and Sioux along the Platte River; Brigadier General Alfred H. Terry, commander of the Military Department of Dakota; Senator John B. Henderson of Missouri, Chairman of the Senate Indian Appropriations Committee, who had introduced the bill that created the peace commission; Colonel Samuel F. Tappan, formerly of the First Colorado Volunteer Cavalry and a peace advocate who had led the U.S. Army's investigation of the Sand Creek massacre; Major General John B. Sanborn, formerly commander of the Upper Arkansas District, who had previously helped to negotiate the Little Arkansas Treaty of 1865. Sherman, having made public remarks indicating his disagreement with the peace policy, was called to Washington, D.C. and could not be present at the councils on the southern plains, including the council at Medicine Lodge Creek. Major General Christopher C. Augur, commander of the Military Department of the Platte, replaced him as a temporary appointment.

Medicine Lodge River councils 
After an abortive meeting with northern Plains Indians in September, the commission gathered at Fort Leavenworth (Kansas) in early October and traveled from there by rail to Fort Harker.  There it was joined by an escort of five hundred troops of the 7th U.S. Cavalry Regiment and Battery B of the 4th artillery, armed with two Gatling guns.  They were under the command of Maj. Joel H. Elliott, who had been excused from attending the court martial proceedings for Lt. Col. George Armstrong Custer then underway at Fort Leavenworth. The commission was also accompanied by numerous newspaper reporters, who provided detailed coverage of the people and events related to the commission's work.

The commission arrived at Fort Larned (present-day Kansas) on October 11, where some chiefs were already present, including Black Kettle of the Cheyenne, Little Raven of the Arapaho, and Satanta of the Kiowa.  At the insistence of the tribes, the meetings were moved from Larned to Medicine Lodge River (near present day Medicine Lodge, Kansas), a traditional Indian ceremonial site. Preliminary discussions beginning on October 15 concluded that the Hancock expedition led earlier in 1867 by Maj. Gen. Winfield Scott Hancock, during which a large Cheyenne and Sioux village at Pawnee Fork had been destroyed, had been ill-conceived. This conclusion, and the commissioners' apology for the village's destruction, served to clear the air. It created a more positive atmosphere for the councils, which began in earnest on October 19.

Treaty terms and signatories
The treaties negotiated at Medicine Lodge Creek were similar in their terms, involving surrender of traditional tribal territories in exchange for much smaller reservations in Indian Territory (present day Oklahoma) and allowances of food, clothing, equipment, and weapons and ammunition for hunting.

Treaties with the Kiowa, Comanche, and Plains Apache 
The tribes would also be provided houses, barns, and schools worth $30,000, which the tribes had not requested. By a second treaty, the Plains or Kiowa-Apache were incorporated into the first treaty; this treaty was signed by all the Kiowa and Comanche signatories of the first treaty, along with several Plains Apache chiefs. The treaties with the Kiowa, Comanche, and Plains Apache tribes were concluded on October 21, 1867.

Kiowa chiefs signing

 Satank, or Sitting Bear
 Sa-tan-ta, or White Bear
 Wa-toh-konk, or Black Eagle
 Ton-a-en-ko, or Kicking Eagle (Kicking Bird)
 Fish-e-more, or Stinging Saddle
 Ma-ye-tin, or Woman's Heart
 Sa-tim-gear, or Stumbling Bear
 Sit-par-ga, [Sa-pa-ga] or One Bear
 Cor-beau, or The Crow
 Sa-ta-more, or Bear Lying Down

Comanche chiefs signing

 Parry-wah-say-men, or Ten Bears
 Tep-pe-navon, or Painted Lips
 To-sa-in (To-she-wi), or Silver Brooch
 Cear-chi-neka, or Standing Feather
 Ho-we-ar, or Gap in the Woods
 Tir-ha-yah-gua-hip, or Horse's Back
 Es-a-nanaca (Es-a-man-a-ca), or Wolf's Name
 Ah-te-es-ta, or Little Horn
 Pooh-yah-to-yeh-be, or Iron Mountain
 Sad-dy-yo, or Dog Fat

Plains Apache chiefs signing

 Mah-vip-pah, Wolf's Sleeve
 Kon-zhon-ta-co, Poor Bear
 Cho-se-ta, or Bad Back
 Nah-tan, or Brave Man
 Ba-zhe-ech, Iron Shirt
 Til-la-ka, or WhiteHorn

At that conference, the Comanche Chief Parry-wah-say-men (Ten Bears) gave an address that foretold the future of his people:

Treaty with the Cheyenne and Arapaho
Under the Little Arkansas Treaty of 1865, the Southern Cheyenne and Arapaho tribes had been assigned as a reservation those portions of Kansas and Indian Territory (present-day Oklahoma) between the Arkansas and Cimarron rivers and lying east of an imaginary line running north from Buffalo Creek on the Cimarron up to the Arkansas. Additionally, the tribes were to be permitted to continue to hunt north of the Arkansas River for as long as the buffalo remained, as long as they stayed away from white settlements and roads. This concession was made to obtain participation of the Dog Soldiers to the treaty terms. A separate treaty version for the Northern Cheyenne was created, but they did not sign, as they were allied with Red Cloud and the Oglala Lakota in hostilities against the US.

Southern Cheyenne chiefs signing

 O-to-ah-nac-co, Bull Bear
 Moke-tav-a-to, Black Kettle
 Nac-co-hah-ket, Little Bear
 Mo-a-vo-va-ast, Spotted Elk
 Is-se-von-ne-ve, Buffalo Chief
 Vip-po-nah, Slim Face
 Wo-pah-ah, Gray Head
 O-ni-hah-ket, Little Rock
 Ma-mo-ki, or Curly Hair
 O-to-ah-has-tis, Tall Bull
 Wo-po-ham, or White Horse
 Hah-ket-home-mah, Little Robe
 Min-nin-ne-wah, Whirlwind
 Mo-yan-histe-histow, Heap of Birds

Arapaho chiefs signing

 Little Raven
 Yellow Bear
 Storm
 White Rabbit
 Spotted Wolf
 Little Big Mouth
 Young Colt
 Tall Bear

Unratified 

The Medicine Lodge Treaty required the approval of 3/4 of the adult males on the reservation for any further cessions of land.  In 1887 the Congress changed national policy on allotment of Native American lands by passing the Dawes Act, which promoted allotment of parcels to individual households (they thought 160 acres per household would be adequate for cultivation) to break up the communal land held by tribes, with the government authorized to sell the resulting "surplus".  In the case of the southern Plains Indians, a commission was assigned to gain their agreement to such allotments and sales. The Jerome Agreement of 1892, although never ratified by the tribes, implemented the new allotment policy, effectively removing millions of acres from the reservation. The commission negotiating the agreement had evaded telling the Indians what the sale price would be.  The Kiowa chief Lone Wolf sued the Secretary of the Interior on behalf of the entirety of the Kiowa, Comanche, and Apache tribes, based on their being defrauded by the government at the time.

The case, Lone Wolf v. Hitchcock, was ultimately decided by the US Supreme Court in 1903. In its ruling, the Court conceded that the Indians had not agreed to the land cessions.  But, it concluded that the Congress had the "plenary power" to act unilaterally, so the circumstance did not matter. Its decision expressed the nineteenth-century attitude toward the Native Americans. Quoting from United States v. Kagama (1855) 118 U.S.375 in its ruling, the court reiterated the description of the Indian tribes as "wards of the nation... Dependent largely [on the United States] for their daily food... there arises the duty of protection, and with it the power."

Aftermath
Following the Supreme Court decision, the Congress continued to make unilateral changes to reservation lands without getting agreement by the tribes, beginning in 1903 and 1904 with the Rosebud Indian Reservation in South Dakota. The Commissioner of Indian Affairs, then William Arthur Jones, noted his intention to proceed without Native American consent. As the historian Blue Clark found, Jones wrote that he planned to report officially on land bills before Congress in favor "of Congress taking the property of Indians without their consent." As another example, in 1907 Congress authorized the sale of "surplus" land at Rosebud, again without Indian consent.

The outstanding issues were challenged again in the mid-twentieth century, beginning in 1948.  Combined Kiowa, Apache and Comanche representatives filed suit against the US government for compensation due to the original treaty and subsequent actions, including sales under the unratified Jerome Agreement. Over the following decades and through several claims, the tribes won substantial compensation of tens of millions of dollars from the Indian Claims Commission.

The Medicine Lodge Treaty is dramatized in the 1962 episode, "The Truth Teller", on the syndicated television anthology series, Death Valley Days,  hosted by Stanley Andrews. In the episode, Barney Phillips was cast as General Winfield Scott Hancock and Charles Carlson as Wild Bill Hickok, long after Guy Madison played Hickok in a weekly syndicated series.

See also
 Medicine Lodge Peace Treaty Site, a U.S. National Historic Landmark

Notes

References
 "REPORT TO THE PRESIDENT BY THE INDIAN PEACE COMMISSION, JANUARY 7, 1868", in Annual Report of the Commissioner of Indian Affairs for the Year 1868, (Washington, D.C.: Government Printing Office, 1868), 26–50.
 Cozzens, Peter, ed. (2003). Eyewitnesses to the Indian Wars, Volume Three: Conquering the Southern Plains], Mechanicsburg, PA: Stackpole Books. .
 Greene, Jerome A. (2004). Washita, The Southern Cheyenne and the U.S. Army. Campaigns and Commanders Series, vol. 3. Norman, OK: University of Oklahoma Press. .
 Hoig, Stan. (1980). [https://books.google.com/books?id=esuewT_lSwwC&q=%22the+battle+of+the+washita%22+hoig The Battle of the Washita: The Sheridan-Custer Indian Campaign of 1867–69. Lincoln, NE: University of Nebraska Press. . Previously published in 1976 (Garden City, NY: Doubleday). .
 "Treaty with the Kiowa and Comanche, 1867" (Medicine Lodge Treaty). 15 Stats. 581, October 21, 1867. Ratified July 25, 1868; proclaimed August 25, 1868. In Charles J. Kappler, compiler and editor,Indian Affairs: Laws and Treaties — Vol. II: Treaties, pp. 977–982. Washington, D.C.: Government Printing Office, 1904. Through Oklahoma State University Library, Electronic Publishing Center.
 "Treaty with the Kiowa, Comanche, and Apache, 1867" (Medicine Lodge Treaty). 15 Stats. 589, October 21, 1867. Ratified July 25, 1868; proclaimed August 25, 1868. In Charles J. Kappler, compiler and editor, Indian Affairs: Laws and Treaties — Vol. II: Treaties, pp. 982–984. Washington, D.C.: Government Printing Office, 1904. Through Oklahoma State University Library, Electronic Publishing Center.
 "Treaty with the Cheyenne and Arapaho, 1867" (Medicine Lodge Treaty). 15 Stats. 593, October 28, 1867. Ratified July 25, 1868; proclaimed August 19, 1868. In Charles J. Kappler, compiler and editor, Indian Affairs: Laws and Treaties — Vol. II: Treaties, pp. 984–989. Washington, D.C.: Government Printing Office, 1904. Through Oklahoma State University Library, Electronic Publishing Center.
 A.A. Taylor, "MEDICINE LODGE PEACE COUNCIL", Chronicles of Oklahoma, Volume 2, No. 2, June 1924 (first-person account by Alfred A. Taylor, future governor of Tennessee, about events when he accompanied his father Nathaniel Green Taylor of the IPC)

External links
 

1867 in the United States
Indigenous peoples of the Great Plains
Medicine Lodge
Comanche campaign
Apache
Arapaho
Cheyenne tribe
Kiowa
1867 treaties
Native American history of Kansas